The Canal de l'Assemblée nationale is a Quebec television network, which broadcasts the proceedings of the National Assembly of Quebec on cable television. The channel launched October 3, 1978.

External links
 Canal de l'Assemblée nationale

References

Commercial-free television networks
Quebec government departments and agencies
Legislature broadcasters in Canada
Quebec Legislature